Tars and Stripes is a 1935 American Educational Pictures short comedy film directed by and starring Buster Keaton. The film was shot at the Naval Training Center San Diego, California.

Plot
At a Navy training station, Apprentice Seaman Elmer Doolittle is constantly mocked and berated due to his constant clumsiness and lack of common sense. He is frequently given mundane tasks to complete in order to keep him away from the other apprentices with actual potential but Chief Gunners Mate Richard Mack vows to make a sailor out of him if it kills him. After failing to teaching how to tie knots or march properly, Mack becomes angered after he believes he witnesses Elmer flirting with his girlfriend when in actuality he was just helping fix her broken shoe. Elmer eventually reaches the rank of seaman but Mack's girlfriend eventually does develop feelings for Elmer and this enrages Mack who banishes Elmer to the brig and tells him he will stay there. Elmer dismays but soon perks up after realizing Mack's girlfriend has snuck into the brig as well.

Cast
 Buster Keaton as Apprentice Seaman Elmer Doolittle
 Vernon Dent as Chief Gunners Mate Richard Mack
 Dorothea Kent as Mack's Girlfriend

See also
 Buster Keaton filmography

References

External links

 Tars and Stripes at the International Buster Keaton Society

1935 films
1935 comedy films
1935 short films
Educational Pictures short films
American black-and-white films
Films directed by Buster Keaton
Films directed by Charles Lamont
Military humor in film
American comedy short films
1930s American films